Oldsmobile produced a straight-6 automobile engine from 1923 to 1950. It was a conventional side-valve engine of varying capacities and at stages was shared with GMC.

Although the engines changed from year to year there were basically 5 series of Oldsmobile side-valve 6 cylinder engines over the 27 years of production, 1923 to 1927, 1928 to 1931, 1932 to 1936, 1937 to 1948 and 1949 to 1950. The '49 to '50 Big Six was to be the last inline six built by Oldsmobile although there were a few models in the late '60s and early '70s built using the overhead valve Chevrolet Turbo-Thrift engine.

505
The  was used by the Oldsmobile Series 23 between 1910 & 1912. It used a T-head engine configuration and made 60 bhp. In 1911 the displacement increased to  while remaining at 60 bhp

380
The  was used by the Oldsmobile Model 53 between 1913 & 1915, and made 50 bhp.

177
The  was used by the Oldsmobile Model 37 between 1917 & 1921 and made 40 bhp.

169.3
The  was used by the Oldsmobile Model 30 between 1923 & 1926. It used a 2 3/4" bore and 4 3/4" stroke and made 40 bhp @ 2600

185
The  was used by the Oldsmobile F-Series for the 1927 model year only and it was basically an over-bored 169.3. It used a 2 7/8" bore and 4 3/4" stroke and made 44 bhp @ 2600rpm .

197.5
The  was used by the Oldsmobile F-Series between 1928 and 1931 in various power outputs. It used a 3 3/16" bore and 4 1/8" stroke, had a compression ratio of 5.2:1 and when released in 1928 made 55 bhp @ 2700rpm.

In 1929 the intake was upgraded from 1" to a 1 1/4" carburetor and power increased to 61 bhp @ 3000. 1931 saw another increase in power to 65 bhp @ 3350.

213.3
The  was used by the Oldsmobile F-Series between 1932 & 1936 and also GMC in their 1936 T-14 & T-16 trucks.   It used a 3 5/16" bore and 4 1/8" stroke and on its introduction in 1932 had a compression ratio of 5.3:1 and made 74 bhp @ 3200.

For 1933 the capacity was increased 221.4 but then in 1934 it reverted to the original 213.3 and with a higher compression ratio of 5.7:1 made 84bhp @ 3200 along with the '33s shell bearings.

221.4
The  was used by the Oldsmobile F-Series for one year in 1933 and then reverted to using the 213.3.  It used a 3 3/8" bore and 4 1/8" stroke.

This 1933 engine was the first Olds to use removable "shell" bearings in lieu of the earlier poured in place babbit bearings.

229.7
The  was used by the Oldsmobile F-Series, Oldsmobile Series 60 and Oldsmobile Series 70 between 1937 & 1940 and also GMC in their 1937 & 1938 T-16, F-16, T-16H and F-16H trucks. It used a 3 7/16" bore and 4 1/8" stroke.

216
The  was used by Oldsmobile for only one year in 1939 for the 60 series vehicle.  It was basically a de-stroked 229.7 and used the same 3 7/16" bore but a 3 7/8" stroke.

238
The  238 was used by the Oldsmobile Series 60 and Oldsmobile Series 70 between 1941 and 1948. It used a 3 1/2" bore and 4 1/8" stroke

257
The  257 was used only by the Oldsmobile 76 during the 1949-50 model years.  It used a 3 17/32" and 4 3/8" stroke. These engines were known as the "Big Six" and had this description cast into the cylinder head.

See also
Oldsmobile Straight-8 engine
Oldsmobile V8 engine
List of GM engines

References

Straight-six engines
Straight-6